Uwe Fuchs (born 23 July 1966) is a German football coach and former player.

Playing career
Fuchs was born in Kaiserslautern.

He was loaned to Middlesbrough towards the end of the 1994–95 season, playing just 15 games, but was instrumental in helping the club win promotion to the Premier League, scoring nine league goals. Fuchs went on to become a cult figure at Middlesbrough; but he was not kept at the club by manager Bryan Robson for the following season.

Managerial career
In January 2005, he took over the helm at the Wuppertaler SV (Regional Northern League). On 23 December 2008, he re-joined Wuppertaler SV, but was released on 2 April 2010.

On 31 May 2011, he replaced Heiko Flottmann as manager of VfL Osnabrück.

Personal life
His father Fritz Fuchs is also a coach and a former player. His uncle Werner Fuchs was also a coach.

Honours
 DFB-Pokal finalist: 1986–87, 1990–91
 Bundesliga runner-up: 1993–94
 Football League First Division (II): 1995

References

External links
 Fuchs with cup winning side at BBC
 

1966 births
Living people
German footballers
Germany under-21 international footballers
German expatriate footballers
FC 08 Homburg players
Stuttgarter Kickers players
SC Fortuna Köln players
Fortuna Düsseldorf players
1. FC Köln players
1. FC Kaiserslautern players
Middlesbrough F.C. players
Millwall F.C. players
Arminia Bielefeld players
Bundesliga players
2. Bundesliga players
English Football League players
Expatriate footballers in England
German expatriate sportspeople in England
German football managers
Fortuna Düsseldorf managers
Rot Weiss Ahlen managers
Wuppertaler SV managers
VfB Lübeck managers
SC Fortuna Köln managers
VfL Osnabrück managers
3. Liga managers
Association football forwards
West German footballers
People from Kaiserslautern
Footballers from Rhineland-Palatinate